Vedran Ivanković (born 3 May 1983) is a  Croatian football retired defender, who last played for SV 09 Bübingen.

Club career
Ivanković had a lengthy spell in the Croatian top flight with Zagreb and moved to Germany in 2013 to play for several amateur sides.

References

External links

Vedran Ivanković profile at Nogometni Magazin 

1983 births
Living people
Sportspeople from Zenica
Croats of Bosnia and Herzegovina
Association football fullbacks
Croatian footballers
Croatia youth international footballers
Croatia under-21 international footballers
HNK Cibalia players
NK Zagreb players
Soproni VSE players
NK Hrvatski Dragovoljac players
NK Vinogradar players
NK Krka players
Croatian Football League players
Nemzeti Bajnokság II players
First Football League (Croatia) players
Slovenian PrvaLiga players
Croatian expatriate footballers
Expatriate footballers in Hungary
Croatian expatriate sportspeople in Hungary
Expatriate footballers in Slovenia
Croatian expatriate sportspeople in Slovenia